Cleveland, the second-largest city in the U.S. state of Ohio, is home to 142 completed high-rises, 36 of which stand taller than . The tallest building in Cleveland is the 57-story Key Tower, which rises  on Public Square. The tower has been the tallest building in the state of Ohio since its completion in 1991, and it also stood as the tallest building in the United States between Chicago and New York City prior to the 2007 completion of the Comcast Center in Philadelphia.

The history of skyscrapers in Cleveland began in 1889 with the construction of the Society for Savings Building, often regarded as the first skyscraper in the city. Cleveland went through an early building boom in the late 1920s and early 1930s, during which several high-rise buildings, including the Terminal Tower, were constructed. The city experienced a second, much larger building boom that lasted from the early 1970s to early 1990s, during which time it saw the construction of over 15 skyscrapers, including the Key Tower and 200 Public Square. Overall, the city is the site of three of the four Ohio skyscrapers that rise at least  in height; Cincinnati contains the other. , the skyline of Cleveland is 27th in the United States and 96th in the world with 18 buildings rising at least  in height.

Unlike many other major American cities, Cleveland was the site of relatively few skyscraper construction projects in the 2000s, but this changed beginning in the 2010s. The most recent additions to the Cleveland skyline include the 29-story,  Beacon apartment building downtown on Euclid Avenue and the 34-story,  The Lumen Tower at Playhouse Square. Recent proposals have been for the 36-story Sherwin-Williams global headquarters, and the NuCLEus building project in downtown's Gateway District.



Tallest buildings
This includes spires and architectural details but does not include antenna masts. An equal sign (=) following a rank indicates the same height between two or more buildings. The "Year" column indicates the year in which a building was completed.

Tallest under construction or proposed

Timeline of tallest buildings

This lists buildings that once held the title of tallest building in Cleveland.

Notes
A. 4 story base, tower has 28 stories.
B. The Union Trust Building has since been renamed the Huntington Bank Building.
C. The Ohio Bell Building has since been renamed the AT&T Huron Road Building.

References

Sources

External links

Diagram of Cleveland skyscrapers on SkyscraperPage
ClevelandSkyscrapers.com

 
Cleveland
Tallest buildings
Tallest in Cleveland